The palmar carpal ligament (also volar carpal ligament or Guyon's Tunnel) is the thickened portion of antebrachial fascia on the anterior of the wrist.

The palmar carpal ligament is a different structure than the flexor retinaculum of the hand, but the two are frequently confused. The palmar carpal ligament lies superficial and proximal to the flexor retinaculum. The ulnar nerve and the ulnar artery run through the ulnar canal, which is deep to the palmar carpal ligament and superficial to the flexor retinaculum.

The palmar carpal ligament is continuous with the extensor retinaculum of the hand, which is located on the posterior side of the wrist.

References

See also
 Flexor retinaculum of the hand
 Extensor retinaculum of the hand
 Antebrachial fascia

Ligaments
Hand